Zak Evans (born 26 March 2000) is an Australian cricketer. He made his Twenty20 debut on 27 January 2020, for the Melbourne Renegades in the 2019–20 Big Bash League season. Prior to his T20 debut, he was named in Australia's squad for the 2018 Under-19 Cricket World Cup. He made his first-class debut on 30 October 2020, for Victoria in the 2020–21 Sheffield Shield season. He made his List A debut on 15 January 2021, for Victoria in the 2020–21 Marsh One-Day Cup.

References

External links
 

2000 births
Living people
Australian cricketers
Melbourne Renegades cricketers
Victoria cricketers
Place of birth missing (living people)